Rhingia  is a genus of hoverflies. They all have a very distinctive long snout. The larvae are associated with  animal dung. Adults feed on nectar and pollen.

Species
R. austriaca Meigen, 1830
R. borealis Ringdahl 1928
R. caerulescens Loew, 1858
R. campestris Meigen, 1822
R. cnephaeoptera Speiser, 1915
R. coerulea Bezzi, 1912
R. congensis Curran, 1939
R. cuthbertsoni Curran, 1939
R. cyanoprora Speiser, 1910
R. formosana Shiraki, 1930
R. fuscipes Bezzi, 1915
R. laevigata Loew, 1858
R. lutea Bezzi, 1915
R. mecyana Speiser, 1910
R. nasica Say, 1823 
R. nigra Macquart, 1845 
R. orthoneurina Speiser, 1910
R. pellucens Bezzi, 1915
R. pulcherrima Bezzi, 1908
R. pycnosoma Bezzi, 1915
R. rostrata (Linnaeus, 1758)
R. saskana Szilády, 1943
R. semicaerulea Austen, 1893
R. trivittata Curran, 1929

References

Bugguide.net. Genus Rhingia

Hoverfly genera
Diptera of Europe
Diptera of Asia
Diptera of Africa
Taxa named by Giovanni Antonio Scopoli
Eristalinae